The common green frog (Hylarana erythraea) is a frog species of in the true frog family Ranidae; some sources still use the old name Rana erythraea. It lives in Southeast Asia and is also known as green paddy frog, red-eared frog or leaf frog. The last name, however, commonly refers to the Neotropical tree frogs which make up the subfamily Phyllomedusinae. These are not closely related to H. erythraea, belonging to family Hylidae instead.

Taxonomy and systematics
Long placed in Rana, it is only as closely related to this genus as is e.g. Amolops. Consequently, the genus Hylarana, of which the common green frog is the type species, warrants re-establishment. Hylarana seems to form a clade together with the similarly revalidated genera Pulchrana and Sylvirana, and presumably also Hydrophylax as well as some species presently placed in Pelophylax (e.g. Kokarit Frog, "P." lateralis).

This frog has confused researchers for a long time, as it resembles tree frogs in habitus. It was initially placed in the tree frog genus Hyla. The junior synonyms of the common green frog are:
 Hyla erythraea Schlegel, 1837
 Hylorana erythraea (lapsus)
 Limnodytes erythraeus (Schlegel, 1837)
 Polypedates erythraea (Schlegel, 1837)
 Rana erythraea (Schlegel, 1837)

Description
They have smooth skin that is bright green above and on sides. Tympanum is distinct.

Distribution and ecology
H. erythraea occurs in Brunei, Cambodia, Indonesia, Laos, Malaysia, Myanmar, Singapore, Thailand, and Vietnam. Introduced populations are found on Sulawesi and the Philippines. The similar frogs from northeastern India and adjacent regions, formerly included here, are now separated as Hylarana tytleri.

Its natural habitats are subtropical or tropical moist lowland forests, subtropical or tropical moist montane forests, freshwater lakes, intermittent freshwater lakes, freshwater marshes, intermittent freshwater marshes, rural gardens, heavily degraded former forest, irrigated land, seasonally flooded agricultural land, and introduced vegetation.

Footnotes

References
 
  (2008): The phylogenetic problem of Huia (Amphibia: Ranidae). Mol. Phylogenet. Evol. 46(1): 49-60.  PDF fulltext

External links
Amphibian and Reptiles of Peninsular Malaysia - Hylarana erythraea

Hylarana
Fauna of Brunei
Amphibians of Cambodia
Amphibians of Indonesia
Amphibians of Laos
Amphibians of Malaysia
Amphibians of Singapore
Amphibians of Thailand
Amphibians of Vietnam
Amphibians described in 1837
Taxonomy articles created by Polbot
Amphibians of Borneo